Rahman Dashdamirov (born 20 October 1999) is an Azerbaijani footballer who plays as a defender for Shamakhi FK in the Azerbaijan Premier League.

Club career
On 28 February 2022, Dashdamirov made his debut in the Azerbaijan Premier League for Shamakhi FK match against Qarabağ.

References

External links
 

1999 births
Living people
Association football defenders
Azerbaijani footballers
Azerbaijan youth international footballers
Azerbaijan Premier League players
Shamakhi FK players